Maria da Fé is a Brazilian municipality located in the state of Minas Gerais. Its population as of 2020 is estimated to be 14,056 people. The area of the municipality is 203.774 km2. The city belongs to the mesoregion South/South-West of Minas Gerais and to the microregion of Itajubá.

Climate 
The city is located in the dominant mesothermic climates in the southeast and south of Brazil, associated with its altitude. The climate is tropical in terms of precipitation but the temperature is affected by elevation, which leads to classify Maria da Fé as a highland tropical climate, as well as Campos do Jordão (Köppen: Cwb). The average temperature is 17 °C (maximum average 23.3 °C and minimum average of 10.1 °C), with warm summers but not as hot as places in valleys in the interior of the country and the winters are colds to Brazil and Minas Gerais. The total precipitation is 1738 mm. Different from oceanic climates, being in the end of the tropics, there is a dry season defined in the winter, they are fences of 7 to 8 cold fronts, without the fronts due to the air dryness, there would be only 40% of the total precipitation for the season. It is the only city in the state where the average temperature rise trend per decade reaches 1 °C. Being in the Mantiqueira Mountains, frost is a common event in normal winter. It can go from 10 occasions in several years.

The city is the coldest of Minas Gerais and one of the coolest of the Brazilian southeast. According to data from the National Institute of Meteorology (INMET), referring to the period between 1976 and 2016, the lowest temperature recorded in Maria da Fé was -8.4 °C on July 21, 1981, and the highest reached 34,4 °C on January 19, 2015. The largest accumulated rainfall in 24 hours reached 173 mm (mm) on January 3, 2000. Other large accumulations equal or greater than 100 mm were 125 mm on October 14, 1995, 103.4 mm on November 26, 2006, and 100.2 mm on February 25, 1995. The lowest relative humidity index reached 15% in the afternoon of August 20, 2005. In recent records there were years like 2013 where there were 23 nights with frost but the following year only 3 days, but varies considerably from year to year going from a few days to more than a dozen. The average of the first frost is on May 18 and the last on August 14, and may occur from early April until the end of September.

Notes

See also
 List of municipalities in Minas Gerais

References

Gallery

Municipalities in Minas Gerais